WP Diamonds is a multinational company that specializes in the recycling of diamonds. The company is headquartered in New York City and has offices in the UK.

The company provides services that allow the public to recycle diamonds designer jewelry, watches, bags and sneakers that are no longer wanted or needed.

History

Andrew Brown launched WP Diamonds in February 2012. The company was created with the aim to increase the use of recycled diamonds in new manufacturing.

The online purchasing system allows customers from around the world to submit information about their diamond, watch or  jewelry online and receive a price quote. Customers then send their items in or schedule an appointment to receive a final price offer.

A month after the creation of WP Diamonds' online purchasing system, they expanded into the United Kingdom opening their first offices in Birmingham. At this time WP Diamonds also operated from offices in Barcelona, Spain and in 2013 WP Diamonds expanded their operations into Canada, where they began purchasing GIA certified and international laboratory certified diamonds from Canadian citizens. In 2018, WP Diamonds launched in Asia opening an office in Hong Kong.

By the end of 2012, Rough & Polished stated that WP Diamonds' had become one of the largest dedicated diamond recycling companies. In February 2013, the company was featured in Le Bijoutier International magazine and around the same time they also featured in Contraste. It was stated during an interview with Professional Jeweller, that the company would be selling the Recycled Diamonds to jewelry retailers, jewelry manufacturers, diamond manufacturers and diamond dealers.

The company then went on to feature in Jewellery Focus Magazine. In 2014, WP Diamonds received an A+ rating from the Better Business Bureau and announced they would also be offering a purchasing solution for used watches and designer jewelry. They again featured in Reuters following a strong year for the Recycled Diamond market as a whole. In addition, WP Diamonds claims on their website to have traded approximately $75 million of recycled diamonds and diamond jewelry in 2014.

In 2018, they opened myGemma an online platform selling pre-owned luxury.

In 2019, they launched their handbag buying division and in 2020 they launched their sneaker buying division.

Recycling of diamonds
WP Diamonds traditionally recycles diamonds and trades them back into the US jewelry market. They are typically purchased by jewelry manufacturers, diamond manufacturers, and dealers. Larger diamonds are handled by a number of certified bodies, but are also resold to a similar end user.

The Recycled Diamond market is much larger than many anticipated. Companies such as Sotheby's and Christie’s reported huge quantities of very recycled diamonds passing through their auction houses, many of which ended up with processors such as WP Diamonds. Tacy a leading researcher in the diamond market, valued the entire industry at $1.2 billion in 2012.

While there is a market for recycled diamonds from companies and industry, WP Diamonds focuses the majority of its operations on buying from the public often with old or unwanted diamond rings. Diamonds that are recycled using this method traditionally go through a number of steps. Diamond buying companies often use a 4-step process buying diamonds from a member of the public. Initially, a valuation of the diamond will take place over the telephone or via email. People can expect to receive 20%-65% of what they paid originally, depending upon where and when they acquired the piece.  During this step, the Weight (carat), Condition, Shape, Clarity, Color, Fluorescence, and Cut Grade will be evaluated.  Also included in this step is the price for the additional materials with the diamond, such as gold or platinum, if it is a ring.

Once the initial evaluation is completed, the buyer will need to see the ring. There are a number of ways this can take place, but some buyers do provide specialist delivery services, so the item can be safely sent via FedEx or UPS or through the postal system. Once the ring has been received a detailed inspection will take place in order to ensure the diamond is the quality detailed and expected.  A final offer will be made and then payment would be discussed.  A consumer should expect to receive funds within 24 hours.

It was stated in a report published by WP Diamonds that the recycling market was vastly focused into a number of areas. One statistic suggested that 30% of those disposing of their diamonds via WP Diamonds were in fact doing so to later upgrade to a more expensive diamond item.

References

External links
 Official website

2012 establishments in New York City
Companies based in New York City
Diamond dealers